CJRH-FM is a First Nations community radio station that operates at 92.5 FM in Waskaganish, Quebec, Canada.

The station is owned by Waskaganish Eeyou Telecommunications Association.

CJRH was a former callsign of a radio station in Toronto, Ontario, which is known today as CFMJ.

External links

Jrh
Jrh
Year of establishment missing